Saint Matthew's Catholic Church is a historic Roman Catholic church building in Mobile, Alabama.  It was built in the Mediterranean Revival style in 1913, shortly after its parish was founded. The building was placed on the National Register of Historic Places on July 3, 1991, as a part of the Historic Roman Catholic Properties in Mobile Multiple Property Submission.

References

National Register of Historic Places in Mobile, Alabama
Churches on the National Register of Historic Places in Alabama
Roman Catholic churches in Mobile, Alabama
Roman Catholic Archdiocese of Mobile
Roman Catholic churches in Alabama
Mediterranean Revival architecture in Alabama
Roman Catholic churches completed in 1913
1913 establishments in Alabama
20th-century Roman Catholic church buildings in the United States